is a railway station on the Jōhana Line in city of Takaoka, Toyama, Japan, operated by West Japan Railway Company (JR West).

Lines

Layout
The station has one ground-level side platform and one ground-level island platform serving a total of three tracks; however, one track is used only by passing freight trains. The platforms are connected by a footbridge. The station is unattended.

Adjacent stations

History
The station opened on 3 April 1899, but was closed in 1902. It was reopened on 20 February 1914. With the privatization of Japanese National Railways (JNR) on 1 April 1987, the station came under the control of JR West.

Passenger statistics
In fiscal 2015, the station was used by an average of 41 passengers daily (boarding passengers only).

Surrounding area
Chuetsu Pulp and Paper Company
Futatsuka Elementary School

See also
 List of railway stations in Japan

References

External links

 

Railway stations in Toyama Prefecture
Stations of West Japan Railway Company
Railway stations in Japan opened in 1914
Jōhana Line
Takaoka, Toyama